Suriname competed in the 2015 Parapan American Games.

Competitors
The following table lists Suriname's delegation per sport and gender.

Athletics

Men

Swimming

Men

References

2015 in Surinamese sport
Nations at the 2015 Parapan American Games
Suriname at the Pan American Games